The 2014 PGA EuroPro Tour, titled as the 2014 HotelPlanner.com PGA EuroPro Tour for sponsorship reasons, was the 13th season of the PGA EuroPro Tour, one of four third-tier tours recognised by the European Tour.

Schedule
The following table lists official events during the 2014 season.

Order of Merit
The Order of Merit was titled as the Race to El Gouna and was based on prize money won during the season, calculated in Pound sterling. The top five players on the tour (not otherwise exempt) earned status to play on the 2015 Challenge Tour.

Notes

References

PGA EuroPro Tour